Adam King Feeney (born September 12, 1983), better known as Ging and by his former stage name Frank Dukes, is a Canadian musician, record producer, and songwriter. A prolific producer, he has worked with artists including Camila Cabello ("Havana," "Never Be the Same," "My Oh My"), Post Malone ("Congratulations," "Better Now," Circles") and The Weeknd ("Call Out My Name"). Following a two decade production career, he retired as Frank Dukes in 2021 to pursue his own music and art as Ging; he released his debut solo album We're Here, My Dear in 2022.

In his early career, Feeney established himself as a producer by working with a number of members of Wu-Tang Clan and G-Unit as well as young Toronto talent like BADBADNOTGOOD. He came to prominence in the 2010s as a composer and beatmaker whose work was utilized by prominent record producers to sample in their own productions; many of his samples have been used in songs for major artists including Drake (with Feeneys' major placement, "0 to 100"), Travis Scott, Taylor Swift, and Kanye West, with some drawing from the Kingsway Music Library, a popular sample library which he has run since 2011. Feeney has helped produce over thirty platinum singles since 2014. Among other awards and nominations, Feeneys' work has won four Grammy Awards from 32 nominations. He is considered one of Canada's top producers having been awarded Songwriter of the Year by SOCAN four times and has received similar honors from BMI, the Juno Awards, Variety, and Jaxsta.

Early life 
Adam King Feeney was born on September 12, 1983, in Toronto, Ontario, Canada, and was raised in the city's northern suburb of Thornhill. His first exposure to creating music was piano lessons at age five; however, he quit lessons after three years due to losing interest in it. He later taught himself to play guitar, bass and drums.

As a teenager, he spent a lot of time skateboarding and gained more interest in music, particularly New York hip hop, becoming a DJ at 15 years old. In 1999, at age 16, Feeney began collecting records from the 1960s and 1970s in an effort to understand how they were made. This habit got him into record production and he bought an MPC the following year. He graduated from St. Robert Catholic High School in Thornhill in 2001. Feeney has stated that he had no intention to make music his profession.

Career

2000s: Early career and first placements 
Feeney began producing music seriously in the early 2000s. He chose the stage name Frank Dukes as a teenager, inspired by the character of Frank Dux in the martial arts film Bloodsport, and competed in a number of local DJ contents. His first production credit was a 2003 remix for Philadelphia rapper Hezekiah and he later had his first paid placement with a Toronto artist named General Too Smooth.

In 2005, he connected with Toronto-based music manager Mo' Jointz who found Duke placements with Toronto and New York-area hip hop artists, including Slaughterhouse's Joell Ortiz, Kool G Rap, and Choclair. Feeney was one of the first producers to work with Drake, producing the track "Money" off his debut mixtape Room for Improvement, released in 2006. Feeney's relationship with producer Boi-1da, who would become one of the in-house producers for Drake's OVO Sound label, has led to many collaborations for Drake since this time.

In 2008 and 2009, he took part in the Red Bull Big Tune producer competition; at these events, he connected with a number of artists and their A&R, most notably G-Unit, Danny Brown, and Wu-Tang Clan's Ghostface Killah. In the late 2000s, Feeney would produce a number of tracks for G-Unit rappers Lloyd Banks and 50 Cent. This included his first paid placement for a major artist, the song "Sooner or Later (Die 1 Day)" on Banks' third studio album H.F.M. 2 (The Hunger for More 2), for which Feeney was $5,000 paid in 2008, among other tracks released years later.

2010s: Sample innovator and acclaim 
Creative relationships and album production

At the end of the 2000s, Feeney connected with Wu-Tang member Ghostface Killah, producing three tracks for his 2010 album Apollo Kids. The two met after Feeney won the Red Bull Big Tune championship in 2009; Feeney had also given Ghost a beat tape the previous year. Feeney performed as his and Cappadonna's tour DJ; active as a DJ in Toronto, Feeney also played sets during their tour as well as at the 2010 CMJ Music Marathon in New York City.

This relationship led to a series of Wu-Tang-related collaborations over the following five years, including producing more than half the tracks for the RZA-produced The Man with the Iron Fists album in 2012. He also worked on his own unreleased album, collaborating with Danny Brown and Willie the Kid, among others. During the same period, Feeney met the Canadian hip hop/jazz group BADBADNOTGOOD at their first live show in 2011. Feeney and the group became close collaborators, even sharing a studio for many years; the band members play on many of the samples Feeney produced during the decade and, in turn, Feeney produced their first original album III, released in 2014. Feeney' work with Ghostface and BBNG culminated in their shared 2015 record, Sour Soul.

Kingsway Music Library and sample composition

During the first half of the decade, Feeney began writing music that he could use and manipulate as samples in his own work, much like the traditional record sampling he took part in as a hip hop producer. Inspired in part by his experiences working in 2010/2011 with the Menahan Street Band, a contemporary funk and soul ensemble that employ vintage recording techniques (and achieve the 1960s/1970s sound and style so often sought after in hip hop samples), Feeney began recording his compositions similarly, using vintage and analog equipment. Observing the sample clearance issues and poor royalty splits he experienced while working with 50 Cent and Ghostface, Feeney had the idea of using his body of work as samples for other record producers to use, much like the traditional library music model, and began sharing his work with the likes of Vinylz, DJ Dahi, and Boi-1da; beginning in 2013, he packaged a portion of his compositions into various volumes for a collection titled Kingsway Music Library which he sells with the clearance of his samples guaranteed.

This sample production work created acclaim for Feeney in 2014 when a composition he wrote was given to Boi-1da and flipped into the Drake single "0 to 100." From this point forward, he was inspired to grow Kingsway Music Library into an established platform for original music for sampling. He continues to distribute a limited amount of his music this way and invites up-and-coming musicians to collaborate or contribute whole volumes to his platform. In 2019, he spearheaded a collaboration between Kingsway Music Library and Toronto's Regent Park School of Music. Called Parkscapes, all tracks are performed by students of the music program, and all proceeds, including licensing and royalty payments, help fund the school's programs. As of 2021, Feeney has personally released fifteen volumes of music through Kingsway.

His compositions, including those designated for Kingsway Music, have led to him working with record producers such as Boi-1da, Metro Boomin, Vinylz, DJ Dahi, and more, landing him prominent placements for Kanye West, Mac Miller, Drake, Eminem, Jeremih, Tory Lanez and Rihanna, among others.

Hitmaker

Feeney began growing in notability in 2013/2014 and started working more often with major artists in the studio. He met producer Louis Bell and Post Malone in 2015–2016 and worked on tracks for Post Malone's debut album Stoney (including "Congratulations"); Feeney also worked extensively on Post's 2019 album Hollywood's Bleeding. In 2017, he produced a string of singles for Frank Ocean and Blonded Radio ("Chanel", "Biking", "Lens").

In 2018, three albums that Feeney executive produced were released: the debut solo album of frequent collaborator Matty from BadBadNotGood; The Weeknd's My Dear Melancholy EP, which included the single "Call Out My Name"; and Camila Cabello's debut album Camila. Feeney met Cabello in November 2016, beginning what would be her debut album. Notably, he produced her wildly successful single "Havana." During this period until around 2020, he was represented by Electric Feel Management.

In total, Feeney was a credited producer or songwriter on over 300 tracks during the decade, including multiple tracks for artists Mac Miller, Amine, Drake, Lorde, and Travis Scott, among others. By the end of the decade, he was generally considered one of the top producers/songwriters; he was also named or nominated as Songwriter of the Year by multiple music industry organizations including BMI, SOCAN, the Juno Awards, and the iHeartRadio Music Awards.

2020s: New ventures as Ging 
Into the 2020s, Feeney continued to work with artists like Rosalía and The Weeknd in addition to producing a number of tracks for Don Toliver and Shawn Mendes. Throughout 2020, he worked with Canadian artist Mustafa (who had previously co-written a number of pop hits with Feeney) on his debut album When Smoke Rises, released May 2021; the album was short-listed for Canada's 2021 Polaris Music Prize. His collaborations with Rosalía were released in March 2022 on her album Motomami. In March 2022, he was named the world's fifth most successful producer by Jaxsta, which considered a number of factors in their metric for the previous twelve months. He followed Jack Antonoff, Louis Bell, Mike Dean, and Finneas.

In September 2021, he partnered with Tracklib on which he distributes hundreds of masters and stems. The following month, Feeney announced The Prince, a signature synths plug-in, created with the software company Cradle.

On November 16, 2021, Feeney released his beat tape The Ghost of Ging. The album was released as NFTs and available to stream on SoundCloud for one week; it was later released on streaming services. Three days later, he announced his retirement as Frank Feeney on social media. He indicated that he would continue working on new music projects under the name of Ging (a variation of his middle name King). Since that time, he has released generative music and art and has been vocal about artistic innovation like the use of Web3. In 2022, he began releasing and performing his original studio music.

His debut album We’re Here, My Dear was be released in November 2022.

Style 
During his early career, Feeney worked within the East Coast hip hop and boom bap sound, with some contemporary and progressive influences. In the early 2010s, he embraced a more retro analog sound which has since evolved into his oft-imitated eclectic and effects-heavy style. SPIN noted that Feeney' production aesthetic is informed by 'shimmering pop nostalgia' and the 'luxurious hollows' of the New Toronto sound and inspired by disparate genres. On his writing style, Ryan Tedder observed, "Frank Feeney likes weird chord progressions. He doesn't like anything to sound clean or normal."

Feeney is known for achieving his sound through live instrumentation and analog equipment. To achieve this, he often collaborates with an informal group of Toronto-based musicians and songwriters which includes Mustafa Ahmed, Kaan Güneşberk, and the members of instrumental group BADBADNOTGOOD; Feeney and the band shared an analog recording studio in Toronto for much of the 2010s. At times, he has also written music for other artists with fellow Torontonians Daniel Caesar, River Tiber, and Charlotte Day Wilson, as well as with New York-based retro soul musicians Thomas Brenneck and Homer Steinwiess; of note, Feeney and Steinweiss formed a short-lived production duo under the name Silver & Gold and worked with a number of New York soul and funk artists in the early 2010s. Outside of this group, Feeney has frequently collaborated with producers Louis Bell, Boi-1da, Vinylz, and Metro Boomin, among others.

Personal life 
Feeney has two sons. He resides in Los Angeles, California, having moved from Mississauga, Ontario.

Discography 

 We're Here, My Dear (2022)

Notable production credits 

Singles certified RIAA Platinum

 Drake – "0 to 100 / The Catch Up" (2014)
 Jeremih – "Planez" feat. J. Cole (2015)
 Drake & Future – "Diamonds Dancing" (2015)
 Drake – "10 Bands" (2015)
 Drake – "Right Hand" (2015)
 Rihanna – "Needed Me" (2016)
 Kanye West – "Real Friends" (2016)
 J. Cole – "Immortal" (2016)
 Drake – "Pop Style" (2016)
 Young Thug & Travis Scott – "Pick Up the Phone" (2016)
 Post Malone – "Deja Vu" feat. Justin Bieber (2016)
 Post Malone –  "Congratulations" (2016)
 Drake – "Fake Love" (2016)
 Frank Ocean – "Chanel" (2017)
 Drake – "Blem" (2017)
 Lorde – "Green Light"
 Lorde –"Homemade Dynamite" (Remix) feat. Khalid, Post Malone and SZA (2017)
 Romeo Santos – "Imitadora" (2017)
 Camila Cabello – "Havana" (2017)
 Camila Cabello – "Never Be the Same" (2017)
 Kendrick Lamar & The Weeknd – "Pray for Me" (2017)
 Cardi B – "Be Careful" (2018)
 The Weeknd – "Call Out My Name" (2018)
 The Weeknd – "Wasted Time" (2018)
 Rich the Kid – "Splashin" (2018)
 Post Malone – "Better Now" (2018)
 Post Malone – "Spoil My Night" feat. Swae Lee (2018)
 Post Malone – "Rich & Sad" (2018)
 Post Malone – "Wow" (2018)
 Post Malone – "Circles" (2019)
Rosalía & J Balvin – "Con Altura" feat. El Guincho (2019)
 Jonas Brothers – "Sucker" (2019)
 Camila Cabello – "My Oh My" feat. DaBaby (2020)

Albums executive produced

 BADBADNOTGOOD – III (2014)
 BADBADNOTGOOD & Ghostface Killah – Sour Soul (2015)
 Camila Cabello – Camila (2018); peaked at No. 1 (US Billboard 200)
 The Weeknd – My Dear Melancholy (2018); peaked at No. 1 (US Billboard 200)
 Matty (of BADBADNOTGOOD) – Déjàvu (2018)
 Mustafa – When Smoke Rises (2021)

Awards and nominations

ASCAP Awards 
ASCAP hosts a series of annual awards which honor achievement in American songwriting, composition, and publishing. Feeney has received honors at ASCAP's Pop Music, Latin, and Rhythm & Soul Awards ceremonies.

BMI Awards 
BMI hosts a series of annual awards which honor achievements by songwriters, composers, and publishers, based on tracks performance time. Feeney has received honors at ASCAP's Pop, R&B/Hip-Hop, and London Awards ceremonies.

Grammy Awards 
Feeney' work has been included in the Grammy Award nominations every year since 2015. From 32 nominations, he has won four awards; all of his wins are for track production credits on an awarded album. The following works are for his role as producer unless otherwise noted.

Grammy Certificate-eligible contributions as per award category specifications on contribution playing time.

iHeartRadio Music Awards 
The iHeartRadio Music Awards is an annual awards that honors music played across American radio.

Juno Awards 
The Juno Awards are Canada's most popular music industry awards. As per Juno regulations, performing producers and songwriters do not receive honors for their nominated work. As such, Feeney has one nomination.

Latin Grammy Awards 
Feeney has received six nominations and three awards at the Latin Grammy Awards.

Red Bull Big Tune 
The Red Bull Big Tune competition is an annual series in which hip hop producers battle head-to-head, much like DJ competitions. Feeney competed from 2007 to 2009, at which point he was crowned the national champion.

 2008:  Red Bull Big Tune – Detroit Runner Up
 2008:  Red Bull Big Tune Finals Runner Up
 2009:  Red Bull Big Tune – Detroit Runner Up
 2009:  Red Bull Big Tune Finals Champion

SOCAN Awards 
The SOCAN Awards are Canadian music industry awards, honoring achievement of its members in songwriting, composing, and publishing. Feeney has thrice been awarded Songwriter of the Year.

Other accolades 

Notes

References 

1983 births
Living people
Canadian record producers
Canadian songwriters
Canadian hip hop DJs
Latin Grammy Award winners
Musicians from Toronto
Canadian hip hop record producers
Canadian musicians of Filipino descent